Geirmund "Geddi" Brendesæter (born 22 March 1970) is a Norwegian former professional football defender.

Club career
Brendesæter played 13 seasons for Brann. His debut was on 1 June 1991, and he played his last match against Vålerenga in the last match of the season 2003. He played mostly as a right defender. During this period he also played 13 matches for the German team Arminia Bielefeld in 1997, but returned to Brann to play the last half of the season. Brendesæter played in total 336 matches for Brann, but scored only seven goals.

In the 2001 season, he went to the media and asked the supporters if he should retire or not. The voting ended with 3525 votes to continue, and 3429 votes to retire. Eventually Brendesæter signed a new contract. In his last match for Brann, he was put on as a substitute a few minutes before the end, the crowd going wild as he entered the pitch. He was placed as a striker, the position which he had played in as a junior player, but had never been used in for Brann.

Cult status
Brendesæther, more commonly known as "Geddi", has been subject to a certain degree of idolizing by the supporters of SK Brann. This is due to his fierce loyalty to the club, alongside his blazing right-flank raids. According to former Brann captain and Aberdeen F.C. left-back Cato Guntveit, the young Brendesæther consistently used to do the tunnel dribble on his opponents while setting the Tippeligaen alight with his firework displays and trademark haircut.

International career
Brendesæther also made six appearances for Norwegian national team between 1993 and 1995.

References

External links
 

Living people
1970 births
People from Stord
Association football fullbacks
Norwegian footballers
Norway international footballers
SK Brann players
Arminia Bielefeld players
Bremnes IL players
Bundesliga players
Expatriate footballers in Germany
Norwegian expatriate footballers
Sportspeople from Vestland